Angela Jursitzka (born 1938 in Česká Lípa) is an Austrian journalist and writer. In 1946, she was expelled from Czechoslovakia together with the majority of Sudeten Germans, and came to Tyrol. At the age of 50, she began to write.

Publications 
Gauner Gold und Erdbeereis. Jugendkriminalroman. Berenkamp Verlag, Schwaz 1994. 
Das Gähnen der Götter. Tirol vor 2299 Jahren. Roman. 2003. 
Alle Kriege wieder. Eine Historie. Verlag Bibliothek der Provinz, Weitra 2015.

External links 
 http://dasgaehnendergoetter.pegasus-tirol.com

1938 births
Living people
20th-century Austrian journalists
20th-century Austrian women writers
Sudeten German people
People from Česká Lípa
21st-century Austrian journalists